Steve Allman (born 16 May 1968) is a Norwegian former professional ice hockey goaltender.

Allman was born in Oslo, Norway. He played in the Eliteserien for Furuset Ishockey, Trondheim Black Panthers and Manglerud Star Ishockey. He also played for the Norwegian national ice hockey team at the 1992 Winter Olympics.

References

External links

1968 births
Living people
Furuset Ishockey players
Ice hockey players at the 1992 Winter Olympics
Manglerud Star Ishockey players
Norwegian ice hockey goaltenders
Olympic ice hockey players of Norway
Ice hockey people from Oslo
Trondheim Black Panthers players